Acrocerinae is a subfamily of Acroceridae. They are small distinctive flies whose larvae are endoparasites of spiders. Adult hunchback-flies visit flowers to feed on nectar. Traditionally the subfamily included the genera now placed in Cyrtinae and Ogcodinae, but the subfamily in this sense was found to be polyphyletic and was split up in 2019.

Systematics
The subfamily includes two extant genera and one extinct:
 Acrocera Meigen, 1803
 Carvalhoa Koçak & Kemal, 2013
 †Schlingeromyia Grimaldi & Hauser in Grimaldi, Arillo, Cumming & Hauser, 2011

The extinct fly genus †Burmacyrtus Grimaldi & Hauser in Grimaldi, Arillo, Cumming & Hauser, 2011 was originally placed in this subfamily as well, but according to Gillung & Winterton (2017) it is not considered an acrocerid.

References

Further reading
 
 

Acroceridae
Brachycera subfamilies
Taxa named by William Elford Leach
Endoparasites